Natjav Dariimaa (born 19 May 1950) is a Mongolian archer who competed in archery for Mongolia in the 1972 and 1976 Summer Olympic Games.

Olympics 

Dariimaa competed in the women's individual event and finished fourteenth with a total of 2341 points.

In Montreal she finished 22nd in the women's individual event with a total of 2209 points.

References

External links
 
 Profile on worldarchery.org

1950 births
Living people
Mongolian female archers
Olympic archers of Mongolia
Archers at the 1972 Summer Olympics
Archers at the 1976 Summer Olympics
20th-century Mongolian women